Carl Gustaf Olof Wejnarth (24 April 1902 – 22 April 1990) was a Swedish sprinter who competed in the 1924 Summer Olympics. He won a silver medal in the 4×400 m relay and failed to reach the final of the individual 400 m event.

References

External links 
 

1902 births
1990 deaths
Swedish male sprinters
Olympic athletes of Sweden
Athletes (track and field) at the 1924 Summer Olympics
Olympic silver medalists for Sweden
Medalists at the 1924 Summer Olympics
Olympic silver medalists in athletics (track and field)
People from Eskilstuna
Sportspeople from Södermanland County
20th-century Swedish people